Kanakaris (Greek: Κανακάρης) may refer to the following persons:

Athanasios Kanakaris (1760–1823), a Greek revolutionary and politician
Athanasios Kanakaris-Roufos (1830–1902), a Greek politician
Loukas Kanakaris-Roufos (1878-1949), a Greek politician
Rodis Kanakaris-Roufos (1924-1972), a Greek diplomat and writer 

Greek-language surnames
Surnames
el:Κανακάρης-Ρούφος